Lennart Liljedahl (born 27 August 1947), is a Swedish chess player, two-times Swedish Chess Championship medalist (1970, 1973).

Biography
In the 1970s Lennart Liljedahl was one of the leading Swedish chess players. Lennart Liljedahl participated many times in the finals of Swedish Chess Championship and won two silver medals: 1970 and 1973.

Lennart Liljedahl played for Sweden in the Chess Olympiads:
 In 1970, at fourth board in the 19th Chess Olympiad in Siegen (+3, =3, -5),
 In 1972, at fourth board in the 20th Chess Olympiad in Skopje (+4, =8, -3),
 In 1974, at fourth board in the 21st Chess Olympiad in Nice (+4, =4, -6).

Lennart Liljedahl played for Sweden in the World Student Team Chess Championships:
 In 1970, at second board in the 17th World Student Team Chess Championship in Haifa (+2, =4, -3),
 In 1974, at second board in the 20th World Student Team Chess Championship in Teesside (+4, =4, -5).

Lennart Liljedahl played for Sweden in the Clare Benedict Cup:
 In 1974, at fourth board in the 21st Clare Benedict Chess Cup in Cala Galdana (+1, =4, -1).

Lennart Liljedahl played for Sweden in the Nordic Chess Cups:
 In 1971, at fourth board in the 2nd Nordic Chess Cup in Großenbrode (+1, =4, -0) and won team gold medal,
 In 1973, at sixt board in the 4th Nordic Chess Cup in Ribe (+0, =3, -2) and won team silver medal.

References

External links

Lennart Liljedahl chess games at 365chess.com

1947 births
Living people
Swedish chess players
Chess Olympiad competitors